Lelam is a village in Malfejan Rural District, in the Central District of Siahkal County, Gilan Province, Iran. At the 2006 census, its population was 20, in 6 families.

References 

Populated places in Siahkal County